The 1932 Akron Zippers football team was an American football team that represented the University of Akron in the Ohio Athletic Conference during the 1932 college football season. In its sixth season under head coach Red Blair, the team compiled a 2–4–3 record (1–4–3 in conference), including three scoreless ties, and was outscored by a total of 91 to 37.

Schedule

References

Akron
Akron Zips football seasons
Akron Zippers football